Cerabilia is a genus of beetles in the family Carabidae first described by François-Louis Laporte, comte de Castelnau in 1867.

Species 
Cerabilia contains the following sixty-one species:

 Cerabilia aite Will, 2020
 Cerabilia amaroides (Moore, 1965)
 Cerabilia amieuensis Will, 2020
 Cerabilia aphela (Broun, 1912)
 Cerabilia apicesecta Will, 2020
 Cerabilia australiensis Will, 2020
 Cerabilia australis (Chaudoir, 1878)
 Cerabilia bellensis Will, 2020
 Cerabilia blatta Will, 2020
 Cerabilia danbullaensis Will, 2020
 Cerabilia discosetosa Will, 2020
 Cerabilia dominatrix Will, 2020
 Cerabilia drupa Will, 2020
 Cerabilia edentata Will, 2020
 Cerabilia espee Will, 2020
 Cerabilia francisca Will, 2020
 Cerabilia gigas Will, 2020
 Cerabilia haigensis Will, 2020
 Cerabilia intermedia (Moore, 1965)
 Cerabilia inversa Will, 2020
 Cerabilia iridescens Will, 2020
 Cerabilia kalkajaka Will, 2020
 Cerabilia kanakorum Will, 2020
 Cerabilia klingonorum Will, 2020
 Cerabilia koghisensis Will, 2020
 Cerabilia letalis Will, 2020
 Cerabilia lewisensis Will, 2020
 Cerabilia loxandroides Will, 2020
 Cerabilia major (Broun, 1912)
 Cerabilia maori Castelnau, 1867
 Cerabilia minor (Moore, 1965)  
 Cerabilia monteithi (Baehr, 2007)
 Cerabilia montivaga Will, 2020
 Cerabilia moorei Will, 2020
 Cerabilia mouensis Will, 2020
 Cerabilia mudda Will, 2020
 Cerabilia nana Will, 2020
 Cerabilia neocaledonica Will, 2020
 Cerabilia oblonga (Broun, 1910)
 Cerabilia oodiformis Will, 2020
 Cerabilia orbiculata Will, 2020
 Cerabilia paniensis Will, 2020
 Cerabilia parva Will, 2020
 Cerabilia prolixa Will, 2020
 Cerabilia prosopogmoides Will, 2020
 Cerabilia reflexa Will, 2020
 Cerabilia rubrica Will, 2020
 Cerabilia rufipes (Broun, 1893)
 Cerabilia ruginosa Will, 2020
 Cerabilia securilata Will, 2020
 Cerabilia spinifer Will, 2020
 Cerabilia spuh Will, 2020
 Cerabilia sternovillosa Will, 2020
 Cerabilia storeyi Will, 2020
 Cerabilia striatula (Broun, 1893)
 Cerabilia stylata Will, 2020
 Cerabilia tipica Will, 2020
 Cerabilia uncata Will, 2020
 Cerabilia vitalis Will, 2020
 Cerabilia wisei Will, 2020
 Cerabilia wunduensis Will, 2020

References

Pterostichinae
Taxa named by François-Louis Laporte, comte de Castelnau